The KTLA Telecopter was the world's first television news helicopter, which first went into operation in 1958 and was invented by John D. Silva.  The on-board video and audio equipment communicated with a line of sight KTLA transmitter receiver on top of Mount Wilson.  The first helicopter was leased to KTLA by National Helicopter Service and Engineering Company in Van Nuys. For several years, KTLA (channel 5) was the only TV station with a helicopter based TV camera crewed reporting platform.

The Telecopter was designed and introduced by KTLA chief engineer John D. Silva (1920-2012).

Versions
The first three Telecopters were as follows:

References

Helicopters
Television news
1958 establishments in California